Horea (formerly Arada;) is a commune located in Alba County, Transylvania, Romania. It has a population of 2,371, and is made up of fifteen villages: Baba, Butești, Dârlești, Fericet, Giurgiuț, Horea, Măncești, Mătișești, Niculești, Pătrușești, Petreasa, Preluca, Teiu, Trifești, and Zânzești.

The commune is named after Vasile Ursu Nicola, commonly known as Horea, who was born in 1731 in the village of Arada (now Horea), on Fericet Hill, and who led in 1784 the two-month-long peasant rebellion known as the Revolt of Horea, Cloșca and Crișan.

Horea commune belongs to the Țara Moților ethnogeographical region. Part of the Apuseni Natural Park lies on the administrative territory of the commune.

It is crossed by national road , which joins Albac,  to the south, to the town of Huedin,  to the north. 

References

Communes in Alba County
Localities in Transylvania